Ersin Tatar (born 7 September 1960) is a Turkish Cypriot politician, and the current president of Northern Cyprus. He became the prime minister following the collapse of the coalition government of Tufan Erhürman in May 2019 and served until his own election as president. He was also the leader of the National Unity Party (UBP) and served as leader of the opposition.

Early life
Ersin Tatar was born on 7 September 1960 in Nicosia, the son of politician Rüstem Tatar, and his wife Canev Tatar. He was a boarding pupil at Forest School, a private school in east London, England, and attended Jesus College, Cambridge, where he earned a degree in economics in 1982.

Career
From 1982 to 1986, Tatar worked as a chartered accountant for PriceWaterhouse in England. From 1986 to 1991, he worked for Polly Peck, and was the company's assistant treasurer when it collapsed with debts of £1.3 billion.

In the resulting trial that led to CEO Asil Nadir receiving a ten-year jail term, it was alleged that Tatar had  "assisted Mr Nadir in the dishonest movement of money from PPI and enjoyed a close working relationship with the Polly Peck boss." When Tatar visited the UK in 2019, for the first time since 1991, there was concern that he might be arrested for his Polly Peck role, but the UK's Serious Fraud Office said that it was "no longer in the public interest".

In 1991, he moved to Ankara where he worked at FMC Nurol Defense Industry Co until 1992. From 1992 to 2001, he was the general coordinator of Show TV, a Turkish television channel owned by Ciner Media Group. In 1996, he founded his own Kanal T television channel in Nicosia.

He was also an active member of the Cypriot diaspora community in Turkey, and was chair of the Istanbul Turkish Cypriot Cultural Association from 1997 to 2001.

Politics 

Tatar entered politics in 2003, joining the UBP. He was first elected to parliament in 2009, and served as minister of Finance under Derviş Eroğlu until his party’s defeat in 2013. In 2015, he ran for the UBP leadership and lost. In 2018, he ran again and won.

Tatar voiced support for the 2019 Turkish offensive into north-eastern Syria and said that Cypriot Turks are always on Turkey's side.

Tatar is a supporter of a two-state solution.

One week before the 2020 presidential election, Tatar visited Turkey. After his arrival he announced that he would be reopening the closed-off Varosha beachfront, with Turkish president Tayyip Erdogan’s blessing. The move to open the beachfront, announced by Tatar, drew widespread condemnation both in the north and in the Republic of Cyprus, as well as with the international community. Furthermore, deputy prime minister of that time Kudret Ozersay announced his resignation and has accused of Ersin Tatar of stealing his idea. Ozersay, who was the first to call for the reopening of Varosha under Turkish Cypriot control, said he was against Tatar’s decision because he had turned the issue into a campaign matter ahead of the Turkish Cypriot presidential elections. Ozersay was also a candidate. This has caused the TRNC government to dissolve just one week before the election. Attempting to save face that the decision to open Varosha was not a campaign ploy from Ankara, Tatar said he made the decision as ‘prime minister’ and not as a candidate in the upcoming elections.

Personal life
He is married to Sibel Tatar, and they have two children.

References

1960 births
Living people
Cypriot Muslims
21st-century presidents of Northern Cyprus
21st-century prime ministers of Northern Cyprus
Leaders of political parties in Northern Cyprus
Finance ministers of Northern Cyprus
Prime Ministers of Northern Cyprus
National Unity Party (Northern Cyprus) politicians
People from North Nicosia
Cypriot accountants
Turkish Cypriot politicians
Alumni of Jesus College, Cambridge
People educated at Forest School, Walthamstow
Cypriot expatriates in England
Turkish Cypriot expatriates in the United Kingdom
Turkish Cypriot expatriates in Turkey